Alycia Pascual-Peña (born March 19, 1999) is an American actress known for her role in Saved by the Bell.

Career
Pascual-Peña began her career as a model, modeling for companies such as Neiman Marcus and JCPenney. In 2011, Pascual-Peña was cast as Clara in the television series Chase. Pascual-Pena attended Marist College, where she majored in communications and political science. In 2020, Pascual-Peña was cast as Aisha Garcia in the Saved by the Bell reboot. Her character was not originally an Afro-Latina character, but was re-written to be Latina after she was overheard speaking Spanish on set.

In 2021, Pascual-Peña played Lucy in the Netflix film Moxie.

Filmography

Films

Television

References

External links

1999 births
American film actresses
Living people
American television actresses
21st-century American actresses